Mount Nespelen is a massive mountain, the highest in the coastal ranges between the Mackay and Fry Glaciers, lying on the north side of Benson Glacier, 4 nautical miles (7 km) south of Mount Davidson. Named by the New Zealand Northern Survey Party (1956–57) of the Commonwealth Trans-Antarctic Expedition after the McMurdo Sound that season.

Mountains of Victoria Land
Scott Coast